Yunus Çankaya (born February 23, 1985) is a Turkish professional basketball player for Gaziantep Basketbol of the Turkish Basketball League. He can play at the small forward position.

External links
 TBLStat.net Profile

1985 births
Living people
Bandırma B.İ.K. players
KK Radnički Kragujevac (2009–2014) players
Small forwards
Turkish expatriate basketball people in Serbia
Turkish men's basketball players
Türk Telekom B.K. players
Gaziantep Basketbol players
Yeşilgiresun Belediye players
Mediterranean Games bronze medalists for Turkey
Competitors at the 2009 Mediterranean Games
Mediterranean Games medalists in basketball